The 2000 NCAA Skiing Championships were contested at the Park City Mountain Resort in Park City, Utah as the 47th annual NCAA-sanctioned ski tournament to determine the individual and team national champions of men's and women's collegiate slalom and cross-country skiing in the United States.

Denver, coached by Kurt Smitz, won the team championship, the Pioneers' first co-ed title and fifteenth overall.

Venue

The championships were held at the Park City Mountain Resort in Park City, Utah. 

These were the fifth championships held in the state of Utah (previously 1957, 1963, 1981, and 1991).

Program

Men's events
 Cross country, 10 kilometer freestyle
 Cross country, 20 kilometer classical
 Slalom
 Giant slalom

Women's events
 Cross country, 5 kilometer freestyle
 Cross country, 15 kilometer classical
 Slalom
 Giant slalom

Team scoring

 DC – Defending champions
 Debut team appearance

See also
 List of NCAA skiing programs

References

2000 in sports in Utah
NCAA Skiing Championships
NCAA Skiing Championships
2000 in alpine skiing
2000 in cross-country skiing